Phú Bài is a ward of Hương Thủy town in Thừa Thiên Huế Province, Vietnam.

See also
 Phu Bai International Airport
 Phu Bai Combat Base

References

Populated places in Thừa Thiên Huế province